Nigel is a small gold mining town in Gauteng Province, South Africa, south-east of Johannesburg. The town is at the south-eastern edge of the area known as the East Rand.

Background 
A farmer, shopkeeper and prospector, Petrus Johannes Marais, having read Sir Walter Scott's The Fortunes of Nigel at the time (see Nigel), formed the Nigel Gold Mining Company after the discovery of gold on the farm Varkensfontein in 1886. The town, which grew around the mine, still bears names derived from Scott's book and its characters with the suburb of Glenvarloch and its streets derived from that source.

Today the town is focused primarily on mining and also has various heavy industries.

The town became known as the setting of the popular Afrikaans-sitcom Vetkoekpaleis, a sitcom that revolves around the daily lives of staff members of the Vetkoekpaleis (a Vetkoek-themed fast-food restaurant).

Nigel's municipal government became part of the much larger City of Ekurhuleni Metropolitan Municipality following the creation of new local government structures in 2000, along with most of rest of the East Rand.

On 1 August 2010, a fire at the Pieter Wessels old age home led to the deaths of 22 people.

Main Places

Alra-park
Mackenzie-Ville
Snake-park (Informal Settlement)

References

External links 

 Nigel Business Directory

East Rand
Populated places in Ekurhuleni
Mining communities in South Africa